Alfred James Daplyn (1844 – 19 July 1926) was an English-born Australian artist.

Born in London, Daplyn studied there at the Slade School of Fine Art, the National Academy in New York City, under Jean-Léon Gérôme at École nationale supérieure des Beaux-Arts in Paris and in Rome.

Daplyn migrated to Melbourne in 1881, later becoming secretary of the New South Wales Art Society when he moved to Sydney. The Society's instructor in painting 1885-92, Daplyn influenced Charles Conder, Sydney Long and Julian Ashton. Around 1892, Daplyn spent a year painting in Samoa, meeting his old friend Robert Louis Stevenson.

References
'Daplyn, Alfred James (1843 - 1926)', Australian Dictionary of Biography, Vol. 4, MUP, 1972, pp 16–17.

1844 births
1926 deaths
École des Beaux-Arts alumni
Alumni of the Slade School of Fine Art
19th-century Australian painters
19th-century Australian male artists
20th-century Australian painters
20th-century Australian male artists
English emigrants to Australia
Artists from London
Australian landscape painters
Australian male painters